Kaos (originally Chaos in the US) is a 1984 Italian drama film directed by Paolo and Vittorio Taviani based on short stories by Luigi Pirandello (1867–1936). The film's title is after Pirandello's explanation of the local name Càvusu of the woods near his birthplace in the neighborhood of Girgenti (Agrigento), on the southern coast of  Sicily, as deriving from the ancient Greek word kaos.

Plot
The film depicts four short stories from Pirandello's 15-volume series Novelle per un anno, which play around his birthplace in the 19th century. A raven, which in the introduction is shown to get a bell around his neck from locals, leads one from one story to the next. Each of the stories is approximately 40 minutes in length.

 L’altro figlio ("The Other Son") is about a mother whose two sons have emigrated to the United States. She hasn't heard from them since (14 years ago), but she still favors them over a third son who has stayed behind and tries to help and please his mother. The reason for her completely shunning him are explained in flashbacks to events in 1860, after the arrival of Garibaldi in Sicily.  
 Mal di luna ("Moonsickness") Three weeks after their honeymoon, Sidora discovers that, during the full moon, her husband Batà spends the night howling outside like a werewolf and scratching to get back in. Batà tries to save his marriage by allowing her to have the handsome Saro spend the full-moon nights at their place to protect Sidora.
 La giara ("The Jar") In this comedic section, a feudal landlord (Don Lollò) orders a very large jar for his olive oil, but the new jar breaks almost immediately under mysterious circumstances. The great "jar-fixer" Zi' Dima, famous for his secret-recipe glue, is called to repair the jar, but Zi' Dima manages to fix the jar with himself in it and Don Lollò refuses to break the jar again to let him out.
 Requiem Motivated by the imminent death of their founding father, farmers in a remote hamlet on grounds owned by a baron try to obtain the rights to bury their dead locally rather than in the town, which is over a day's hike away. The baron refuses and carabinieri escort the peasants back to their hamlet to break down the beginnings of a graveyard the peasants are building.

A 20-minute epilogue, Colloquio con la madre ("Conversing with Mother"), describes Pirandello's fictional visit home many years after his mother has died. He asks his mother to retell the story of a trip to Malta she took as a child to visit her exiled father. The ending sequence showed children sliding down the vast slopes of white pumice that flowed into the sea on the island of Lipari.

Cast
 Margarita Lozano as Mariagrazia (in "L'altro figlio'")
 Claudio Bigagli as Batà (in "Mal di luna")
 Enrica Maria Modugno as Sidora (in "Mal di luna")
 Franco Franchi as Zi' Dima (in "La giara")
 Ciccio Ingrassia as Don Lollò (in "La giara")
 Biagio Barone as Salvatore (in "Requiem")
 Omero Antonutti as Luigi Pirandello (in "Colloquio con la madre")
 Regina Bianchi as Pirandello's mother (in "Colloquio con la madre")
 Massimo Bonetti as Saro (in "Mal di luna" and "Colloquio con la madre")

Awards and reception
Kaos won the 1985 David di Donatello awards for best production and best screenplay and was nominated for best music (for Nicola Piovani). It also won the Silver Ribbon award for best screenplay.

The film was very well received by critics, but its length may have prevented wide exposure. In his 2007 book The Best Movies of Our Years, M. Owen Lee considered it the best movie to come out locally in 1986 .

Reviews
Janet Maslin, Chaos (1984), The New York Times, 13 October 1985.
David Denby Poets and Peasants, New York 24 February 1986, pp. 62–63.

External links

1984 films
1984 drama films
Italian drama films
1980s Italian-language films
Films based on works by Luigi Pirandello
Films directed by Paolo and Vittorio Taviani
Films set in Sicily
Italian anthology films
Films scored by Nicola Piovani
1980s Italian films